The Xi'an Ring Expressway is an  long expressway ring road encircling Xi'an, the capital of Shaanxi, China. It is also known as the third ring road of Xi'an, the first two being formed by the road around the city walls, and the second being a grade separated trunk road not built to expressway standards. Every section of the road is also part of a through route of the National Trunk Highway System.

The entire ring is tolled, with toll planned to be abolished in September 2023.

References 

Expressways in Shaanxi
Chinese national-level expressways
Ring roads in China